Wildfires in the Mari Autonomous Oblast, in the east of European Russia, occurred in the summer of 1921. Damage included 2,660 square kilometres of pine forest burned off, with serious repercussions for industry in the area, already paralyzed by the Povolzhye famine. The wildfires led to 35 human and 1,000 cattle deaths, and 60 villages were destroyed. The effects of the fire were made worse by strong winds.

References
 https://web.archive.org/web/20160304124904/http://www.finugor.ru/?q=node%2F875
 http://forestforum.ru/phorum/viewtopic.php?printertopic=1&t=2599&postdays=0&postorder=asc&&start=70&sid=95d5f70c5d148c910f851125b822e423

History of Mari El
1921 Mari
1921 in Russia
1921 fires in Europe
1920s wildfires